Johnny Seven may refer to:

 "Johnny 7", a 1986 single by Twenty Flight Rockers
 Johnny Seven (actor) (1926–2010), American actor
 Johnny Seven OMA, a toy weapon

Seven, Johnny